Cristoval Royas de Spinola (or Christopher Rojas; born of a noble Spanish family, near Roermond in Gelderland in 1626; died at Wiener-Neustadt, 12 March 1695) was a Spanish Franciscan diplomat and Bishop of Wiener-Neustadt.

Life
Educated at Cologne, he entered the Franciscan Order there and for some time taught philosophy and theology. Going to Spain, he was made provincial of his order, and in 1661 accompanied Margaret Theresa of Spain, the first wife of Emperor Leopold I, to Vienna, where he became one of the emperor's influential diplomats.

He was appointed titular Bishop of Knin, in Dalmatia, in 1668 and Bishop of Wiener-Neustadt on 19 January 1686. In his endeavours to bring about a reunion between Protestants and the Catholic Church he had the support of Leopold I. His negotiations with well-known Protestant theologians, such as Molanus, Callistus, Leibniz, etc., and various Protestant courts, especially Hanover and Brandenburg, were encouraged by Pope Innocent XI, and in 1683 led to a conference of Protestant theologians in Hanover to whom Spinola submitted his plan of reunion, Regulae circa Christianorum, omnium ecclesiasticum reunionem. The plan was apparently approved by the Protestant theologians, but French influence and Spinola's concessions induced Innocent XI to take no action. The Helmstedt theologians, represented by Gerhard Wolter Molanus (1633-1722), at the same time put forward their Methodus reducendae unionis. The discussions were approved by the pope and the emperor, but had no popular feeling behind them, and though the negotiations were continued for ten years, especially between Molanus on the one side and Bossuet on the other, no agreement was reached, for the Protestants could not accept the Council of Trent as authoritative or surrender the matter of communion under both species.

On 20 March 1691, the emperor appointed Spinola commissary-general of the movement for ecclesiastical reunion in Austria-Hungary. The concessions which he now made to the Protestants of Austria-Hungary, such as Communion under both species, freedom for priests to marry, Mass in the German language, and suspension of the Tridentine decrees until a new council was held, were rejected by Rome.

Notes

References

Landwehr, Spinolas Unionsbestrebungen in Brandenburg in Märkische Forschungen, XX (Berlin, 1887); 
Kiesl, Der Friedensplan des Leibniz zur Wiedervereinigung der getrennten christlichen Kirchen (Paderborn, 1904);
Knöpfler, in Allg. Deutsche Biog., XXXV, 202-4.

1626 births
1695 deaths
17th-century Roman Catholic bishops in Austria
Spanish diplomats
Spanish Franciscans
People from Wiener Neustadt